Events from the year 1518 in India.

Events
 Lopo Soares de Albergaria ceases his governorship of Portuguese India (commenced 1515)
 Diogo Lopes de Sequeira becomes governor of Portuguese India (and continues until 1522)

Births
 Ibrahim Quli Qutb Shah Wali, later ruler of Golkonda is born (dies 1580)

Deaths
 Kabir, mystic poet dies (born 1440)

See also

 Timeline of Indian history

References